Shizu of Jin may refer to:

Emperor Wu of Jin (236–290), Emperor Shizu of Jin
Hanpu ( 10th century), Jurchen chieftain, honored as Shizu by the Jin emperors